Lose Your Delusion is the seventh overall studio album by Massachusetts-based melodic hardcore band A Wilhelm Scream, and the fifth album under the A Wilhelm Scream name. It was released on April 14, 2022 on Creator-Destructor Records. This is the first AWS in 9 years since their sixth studio album Partycrasher, as well as their first album to not include long-time guitarist Mike Supina, who left the band in 2018 and was replaced by Senses Fail guitarist Jason Milbank in 2019.

Information 
In a 2015 interview, Trevor Reilly had confirmed a follow up to Partycrasher. While in the process of writing new music and touring at the same time, guitarist Mike Supina had left the band in 2018 after 10 years  with the band. In 2019, he was replaced with Senses Fail guitarist Jason Milbank while the band played anniversary shows of the their two albums Mute Print and Ruiner with former guitarist Chris Levesque. Trevor Reilly started building a recording studio and rehearsal room in his home with his wife that year, and it was completed in the beginning of 2021, with the band commencing recording. This was the same year Jason Milbank became a full-time member of the band. Trevor produced the album with James Whitten. Kyle Black mixed the album, and Trevor's brother Joe took the task of mastering.

The band released their first single, "Be One To No One" onto YouTube o January 6, 2022 as a lyric video. 4 days later, they announced the name of the album on their Instagram page. They uploaded another lyric video onto YouTube a month later for Apocalypse Porn on February 10, 2022. They later released two music videos for the singles "GIMMETHESHAKES" on March 16 and "Figure Eights in My Head" on April 11, the latter being uploaded four days before the album's release.

Track listing

Personnel

A Wilhelm Scream 
Nuno Perreira – lead vocals
Trevor Reilly – guitar, vocals, production
Jason Milbanks – guitar
Bryan J. Robinson – bass guitar
Nicholas Pasquale Angellini – drums

Additional musicians 
Chris Levesque – guitar (tracks 3, 5, and 8)
Mike Supina – guitar (tracks 4 and 8)
Sean O'Brien – backing vocals (track 4)

Production 
James Whitten - co-production
Kyle Black - mixing
Joe Reilly - mastering

References 

2022 albums
A Wilhelm Scream albums